Metro Broadcasting, Inc. v. FCC, 497 U.S. 547 (1990), was a case decided by the Supreme Court of the United States that held that intermediate scrutiny should be applied to equal protection challenges to federal statutes using benign racial classifications.  The Court distinguished the previous year's decision City of Richmond v. J.A. Croson Co., by noting that it applied only to actions by state and local governments.  Metro Broadcasting was overruled by Adarand Constructors, Inc. v. Peña, which held that strict scrutiny should be applied to federal laws that use benign racial classifications.

See also
List of United States Supreme Court cases, volume 497

References

External links
 

1990 in United States case law
United States equal protection case law
United States Supreme Court cases
United States Supreme Court cases of the Rehnquist Court
Overruled United States Supreme Court decisions
Federal Communications Commission litigation
United States affirmative action case law
United States racial discrimination case law